Borisogleb is a rural locality (a selo) and the administrative center of Borisoglebskoye Rural Settlement, Muromsky District, Vladimir Oblast, Russia. The population was 659 as of 2010. There are 7 streets.

Geography 
Borisogleb is located on the right bank of the Ushna River, 17 km north of Murom (the district's administrative centre) by road. Petrokovo is the nearest rural locality.

References 

Rural localities in Muromsky District
Muromsky Uyezd